Christian Duguay may refer to:

 Christian Duguay (actor) (born 1970), American comic actor
 Christian Duguay (director) (born 1956), Canadian director